As of February 2018, there are ten mosques in Taiwan. The following table is the list of mosques in Taiwan. Taipei Grand Mosque is the largest and oldest mosque in Taiwan.

See also
 Islam in Taiwan
 Lists of mosques

External links

 Mosques in Taiwan
 Mosque and Prayer Room in Taiwan

 

 
Taiwan
Mosques